Puyallup (  or  ) is a city in Pierce County, Washington, United States, located about 10 miles (16 km) southeast of Tacoma and 35 miles (56 km) south of Seattle. It had a population of 42,973 at the 2020 census. The city's name comes from the Puyallup Tribe of Native Americans and means "the generous people". Puyallup is also home to the Washington State Fair, the state's largest fair.

History

The Puyallup Valley was originally inhabited by the Puyallup people, known in their language as the spuyaləpabš, meaning "generous and welcoming behavior to all people (friends and strangers) who enter our lands." The first white settlers in the region were part of the first wagon train to cross the Cascade Range at Naches Pass in 1853.

Native Americans numbered about 2,000 in what is now the Puyallup Valley in the 1830s and 1840s. The first European settlers arrived in the 1850s. In 1877, Ezra Meeker platted a townsite and named it Puyallup after the local Puyallup Indian tribes, 11 years after departing from Indiana. The town grew rapidly throughout the 1880s, in large part thanks to Meeker's hop farm, which brought in millions of dollars to Puyallup, leading to it eventually being incorporated in 1890, with Ezra Meeker as its first mayor. The turn of the 20th century brought change to the valley with the growth of nearby Tacoma and the interurban rail lines. The Western Washington Fairgrounds were developed giving local farmers a place to exhibit their crops and livestock. During the early part of World War II due to Executive Order 9066, the fairgrounds were part of Camp Harmony, a temporary Japanese American internment camp for more than 7,000 detainees, most of whom were American citizens. Subsequently, they were moved to the Minidoka relocation center near Twin Falls, Idaho.

Geography
It is situated along the Puyallup River, which flows from Mount Rainier to Commencement Bay in Tacoma.

As it is bordered largely by unincorporated Pierce County, the closest neighbors include the city of Sumner to the northeast, Fife and Edgewood to the north, Tacoma to the northwest,  Summit and Midland to the west, South Hill, Graham and Frederickson to the south, McMillin and Orting to the southeast, and Alderton to the east.

Downtown and the valley neighborhoods of Puyallup would likely be damaged or destroyed in a moderate or large eruption of nearby Mount Rainier.

Climate
Puyallup experiences an oceanic climate (Köppen classification: Csb; Trewartha classification: Do). Winters are cool and wet, with high temperatures averaging in the mid to upper 40s and lows near freezing. The surrounding hills (averaging 500 feet (150 m) above sea level) often experience the extremes of winter, with more frequent lows below freezing and greater snowfall. Snowfall is rare, and often only occurs on a few days a year, sometimes as early as November, and as late as April. Spring brings less rain and milder temperatures, with highs regularly in the mid 50s (12–14 °C), to around 60 (15 °C). Spring often records the first 70 °F (21 °C) temperature. Summers are warm and dry, with highs in the 70s most days. Many days can max out in the 80s, and occasionally the 90s. Readings above 100 °F (37.7 °C) are very rare; on July 29, 2009, during a prolonged period of hot weather, Puyallup recorded a temperature of 105 °F (40.5 °C), the warmest since records have been kept. Summer thunderstorms happen occasionally, but are often isolated and rarely (if ever) severe. Storms often roll off the Cascades and into the surrounding areas; they are usually a result of warm moist air from monsoons in the southwestern United States. Summer is warmest in July and August, and occasionally September. By October and the fall season, temperatures start to drop and precipitation increases.

Demographics

2010 census
As of the census of 2010, there were 37,022 people, 14,950 households, and 9,528 families residing in the city. The racial makeup of the city was 84.4% White, 2.1% African American, 1.4% Native American, 3.8% Asian, 0.7% Pacific Islander, 2.1% from other races, and 5.5% from two or more races. Hispanic or Latino of any race were 6.9% of the population.

There were 14,950 households, of which 32.8% had children under age 18 living with them, 45.8% were married couples living together, 12.8% had a female householder with no husband present, 5.1% had a male householder with no wife present, and 36.3% were non-families. 28.5% of all households were made up of individuals, and 10.7% had someone living alone who was aged 65 years or older. The average household size was 2.43 persons and the average family size was 2.98.

The median age in the city was 36.8 years. 23.6% of residents were under age 18; 10.2% were between ages 18 and 24; 27% were from 25 to 44; 26.8% were from 45 to 64; and 12.4% were 65 years of age or older. The gender makeup of the city was 48.0% male and 52.0% female.

2000 census
As of the census of 2000, there were 33,011 people, 12,870 households, and 8,519 families residing in the city. The population density was 2,719.2 people per square mile (1,049.9/km2). There were 13,467 housing units at an average density of 1,109.3 people per square mile (428.3/km2). The racial makeup of the city was 87.88% White, 1.50% African American, 1.01% Native American, 3.27% Asian, 0.34% Pacific Islander, 1.94% from other races, and 4.06% from two or more races. Hispanic or Latino of any race were 4.67% of the population.

There were 12,870 households, out of which 36.0% had children under the age of 18 living with them, 49.7% were married couples living together, 11.7% had a female householder with no husband present, and 33.8% were non-families. 26.9% of all households were made up of individuals, 9.5% of which were 65 years of age or older. The average household size was 2.53 and the average family size was 3.08.

In the city, the age distribution of the population shows 27.3% under the age of 18, 10.2% from 18 to 24, 30.8% from 25 to 44, 20.8% from 45 to 64, and 10.9% who were 65 years of age or older. The median age was 34 years. For every 100 females, there were 93.5 males. For every 100 females age 18 and over, there were 90.9 males.

The median income for a household in the city was $47,269, and the median income for a family was $57,322. Males had a median income of $43,562 versus $27,281 for females. The per capita income for the city was $22,401. About 4.7% of families and 6.7% of the population were below the poverty line, including 7.2% of those under age 18 and 6.5% of those age 65 or over.

Culture

Puyallup valley
The valley in which Puyallup was originally settled forms the town. Its fertile soil is optimal for the acres of daffodils which were grown for distribution worldwide, and are featured in the town's annual spring parade. The Puyallup River meanders between the hills, through the glacial basin, from its namesake glacier on Mt. Rainier, terminating in Puget Sound at the Port of Tacoma. It is cold, silty, and brown, sometimes green. From most perspectives in the town of Puyallup, Mt. Rainier is visible to the southeast.

Downtown Puyallup has several notable landmarks, including Ezra Meeker's mansion, which was built and inhabited by one of the town's founding families, who made their way to Puyallup via the Oregon trail. The downtown shopping district is made up of historic buildings, which date to the town's origin. Pioneer Park is a community focal point, which boasts a public library, a park with a playground, and walking paths. As the focal point of the park, there is a bronze statue honoring Ezra Meeker. A new element is the public stage by the public library. At the public stage local musicians put on free shows for the public. Southeast Puyallup is also where the Pierce County Foothills Trail begins.

Ezra Meeker's mansion

The Ezra Meeker Mansion is an Italianate Victorian building completed around 1890, which was the home of Oregon Trail pioneer Ezra Meeker and his wife Eliza Jane. Known as the "Hop King", Meeker ultimately lost a fortune due to a disease in the hops. He became well known for tracking the Oregon Trail over the years and erecting monuments along its course in an effort to memorialize it. The mansion functions today as a small house museum owned and operated by the Puyallup Historical Society at Meeker Mansion (formerly the Ezra Meeker Historical Society). The building can also be rented out for weddings, teas and other social events.

Washington State Fair
Puyallup is home to the Washington State Fair. It is one of the ten largest U.S. state fairs, attracting over one million people each year. The city itself is built around the Puyallup Fairgrounds, which can be seen prominently from neighboring South Hill. The fair traditionally runs for 21 days in September; there is also a "Spring Fair" which takes place for four days in April. The fair serves as an anchor for local businesses and restaurants. Previously named the "Puyallup Fair", it received its current name in 2013. "Do the Puyallup" has been its long-standing promotional slogan.

During World War II, the Puyallup Fairgrounds became the Puyallup Assembly Area (euphemistically referred to as "Camp Harmony") and were used as an internment camp for United States citizens or residents of Japanese descent or origin.

Daffodil Festival parade
Puyallup also hosts and is origin of the annual four-part Daffodil Parade, which takes place every year in Tacoma, Puyallup, Sumner, and Orting.

The parade includes many groups and has many floats, most of which are covered in daffodils, or are themed in the daffodil season. Most of the local junior high and high school marching bands also march. Car clubs, veteran groups and also some businesses are a part of the parade.

Antique district

Puyallup is known for its myriad antiques stores, many of which are located next to each other on the main north–south street of Meridian. Puyallup is one of many cities and towns in Washington that contains an 'old-fashioned' downtown shopping area.

Paul H. Karshner Memorial Museum
The Karshner Museum is the only K–12 teaching museum owned and operated by a school district west of the Mississippi. The essential education and curriculum-based program serves the Puyallup School District's 20,000 K–12 student population. Since 1930, the Karshner Museum has provided hands-on and curriculum-based learning experiences to thousands of students through the museum visit program. The education trunk or "Discovery Kit" program has served students, teachers and community members since the 1970s. These Kits utilize real or replica artifacts for the purposes of bringing history, art and culture to life in the school classroom.

Arts Downtown outdoor gallery
Starting in 1995, the regional nonprofit organization Valley Arts United began working with local volunteers to support a rotating selection of outdoor public artwork. Consisting mostly of statuary dispersed about the downtown core, this collection has grown to a collection of about 32 permanent pieces. New works are added regularly.

Farmers' market

The Puyallup Main Street Association produces the Puyallup Farmers' Market each year. The market is open Saturdays (9 a.m. to 2 p.m.) from mid-April to mid-October, with a Holiday Market in December (together with the lighted Santa Parade – first Saturday of December). Puyallup Farmers' Market is the largest market in Pierce County and one of the largest in the state. Thousands of people come each week to purchase produce, plants and seeds, flowers, baked goods, meats and cheese, food, local handcrafts, and more. Free live entertainment. The market fills Pioneer Park and the modern pavilion building, and takes over Elm and 4th streets.

Education
The Puyallup School District has 35 schools attended by more than 22,250 students. The district is the ninth largest in Washington state, extending to neighboring South Hill, parts of Tacoma, and the Edgewood area. Some local schools hold annual warning drills on account of the dangers of lahars in the event of an eruption of Mount Rainier, which would leave students with a maximum of 15 minutes to find higher land or the top of a building.

Puyallup is also home to Pierce College Puyallup, a community college that opened in 1990. It is one of the two main campuses belonging to the college, the other being Pierce College Fort Steilacoom in Lakewood.

The city is served by the Puyallup Public Library, which was established in 1913 and has been housed in its current building in Pioneer Park since 2002. It is not affiliated with either the Tacoma Public Library or the Pierce County Library System.

Media
The Herald is the local newspaper for eastern Pierce County. It is published once a week on Wednesdays.  The paper is distributed by The News Tribune.

Transportation
Puyallup is located at the intersection of State Route 167 and State Route 512, with freeway access to Lakewood and the Green River Valley. The city is also served by Pierce Transit buses and Sounder commuter rail at Puyallup station.

The city is located near the Pierce County Airport (KPLU), a small municipal airport in South Hill.

Notable people

 Zach Banner, American NFL football offensive tackle for the Pittsburgh Steelers 
 Frank Brouillet, former Washington State Superintendent of Public Instruction, Member of Washington State House of Reps, Educator 
 Gail Bruce, former American football player
 Army Sergeant First Class Nathan Chapman, First US combat casualty of Operation Enduring Freedom
 Army Major General Chester Victor Clifton Jr.
 Amber Cope, Former NASCAR Driver
 Angela Ruch, professional stockcar driver and sister of Amber Cope
 Natasha Curry, news anchor at CNN Headline News
 Zach Davies, MLB free agent pitcher
 Chris Egan, nine-time Emmy award-winning television sports reporter/anchor for KING-TV
 Brandon Gibson, American football player
 Chris Gildon, state legislator
 Harriet A. Hall, medical columnist and Alternative medicine critic
 Nick Harmer, bassist for Death Cab for Cutie
 Teri Hickel, state representative
 Brock Huard, sports talk show host, former NFL and college quarterback
 Megan Jendrick, Olympic swimmer
 Demetrious Johnson, Former UFC Flyweight fighter
 Dustin-Leigh Konzelman, Miss California (2005) and Amazing Race contestant
 Jon Lester, former MLB pitcher
 Chad Lindberg, actor
 Susan Parks, switchboard operator
 Angela Rasmussen, virologist
 Drew Rasmussen, pitcher currently playing for the Tampa Bay Rays
 Angela Ruch, NASCAR Gander RV & Outdoors Truck Series Driver
 Leonard A. Sawyer, state legislator
 Kelly Sullivan, actress
Randy Tate, former United States congressman 
 Gertrude Wilhelmsen, Olympic athlete
 Soyeon Yi, South Korean astronaut

References

Further reading

External links

 
 
 Puyallup, Washington at Puyallup.com

 
Cities in the Seattle metropolitan area
Cities in Pierce County, Washington
1890 establishments in Washington (state)
Mount Rainier
Cities in Washington (state)
Populated places established in 1877
Washington placenames of Native American origin